The Quinotaur is a mythical sea creature mentioned in the 7th century Frankish Chronicle of Fredegar. Referred to as "the beast of Neptune which resembles a Quinotaur", it was held to have fathered Meroveus by attacking the wife of the Frankish king Chlodio and thus to have sired the line of Merovingian kings.

The name translates from Latin as "bull with five horns", whose attributes have commonly been interpreted as the incorporated symbols of the sea god Neptune with his trident, and the horns of a mythical bull or Minotaur. It is not known whether the legend merged both elements by itself or whether this merger should be attributed to the Christian author. The clerical Latinity of the name does not indicate whether it is a translation of some genuine Frankish creature or a coining.

The suggested rape and subsequent family relation of this monster attributed to Frankish mythology correspond to both the Indo-European etymology of Neptune (according to Jaan Puhvel, from Proto-Indo-European , "grandson" or "nephew", compare also the Indo-Aryan Apam Napat, "grandson/nephew of the water") and to bull-related fertility myths in Greek mythology, where for example the princess Europa was abducted by the god Zeus, in the form of a white bull, that swam her to Crete; or to the very myth of the Minotaur, which was the product of Pasiphaë's, a Cretan Queen's, intercourse with a white bull, initially allotted to King Minos, Pasiphaë's husband, as a sacrifice for Poseidon.

Footnotes

French legendary creatures
Mythological hybrids